The Book of Philip K. Dick is a collection of science fiction stories by American writer Philip K. Dick.  It was first published by DAW Books in 1973.  The book was subsequently published in the United Kingdom by Coronet in 1977 under the title The Turning Wheel and Other Stories.  The stories had originally appeared in the magazines Startling Stories, Science Fiction Stories, Galaxy Science Fiction, Orbit Science Fiction, Imaginative Tales and Amazing Stories.

Contents

 "Nanny"
 "The Turning Wheel"
 "The Defenders"
 "Adjustment Team"
 "Psi-Man"
 "The Commuter"
 "A Present for Pat"
 "Breakfast at Twilight"
 "Shell Game"

Sources

1973 short story collections
Short story collections by Philip K. Dick
DAW Books books